Marfa Dhervilly (1876–1963) was a French stage and film actress.

Selected filmography
 Orange Blossom (1932)
 Beauty Spot (1932) 
 A Day Will Come (1934)
 Sapho (1934)
 The Pearls of the Crown (1937)
 Paris (1937)
 The Red Dancer (1937)
 Fort Dolorès (1939)
 Monsieur Hector (1940)
 The Mondesir Heir (1940)
 The Lost Woman (1942)
 To the Eyes of Memory (1948)
 The Passenger (1949)

References

Bibliography
 Goble, Alan. The Complete Index to Literary Sources in Film. Walter de Gruyter, 1999.

External links

1876 births
1963 deaths
French stage actresses
French film actresses
Actresses from Paris